Kritikerprisen may refer to:

Norwegian Critics Prize for Literature
Norwegian Theatre Critics Award
Norwegian Music Critics Award
Norwegian Dance Critics Award
Danish Critics Prize for Literature